The Ogden Reds were a minor league baseball team in the western United States, based in Ogden, Utah. They played in the Pioneer League for a total of 14 seasons between 1939 and 1955. They were affiliated with the Cincinnati Reds of Major League Baseball (MLB), and played at the Class C level. The team's home field was John Affleck Park.

History
The Reds were one of the six original teams of the Pioneer League when it was formed in 1939. The Reds were league champions in 1940 and 1941, finishing in fourth place and second place, respectively, during the regular season before winning the postseason playoffs. The team competed through the 1955 season, except for three years during World War II when the league did not operate. Hall of Fame inductee Frank Robinson played for the Reds in 1953. After the Reds' final season in Ogden, the city would not have another minor league team until the Ogden Dodgers arrived in 1966.

Season records

All-stars

Notable alumni

Baseball Hall of Fame alumni

 Frank Robinson (1953) Inducted 1982

Notable alumni
 Ed Bailey
 Dave Bristol
 Frank Baumholtz
 Dale Long
 Bobby Mattick

Ogden Reds players

References

External links
Baseball Reference – Ogden teams

Baseball teams established in 1939
Cincinnati Reds minor league affiliates
Defunct Pioneer League (baseball) teams
Defunct sports teams in Utah
Professional baseball teams in Utah
Baseball teams disestablished in 1955
Sports in Ogden, Utah
1939 establishments in Utah
1955 disestablishments in Utah
Defunct baseball teams in Utah